Golęcino may refer to the following places in Poland:
Golęcino, Szczecin
Golęcino, Pomeranian Voivodeship